Autosticha dianeura is a moth in the family Autostichidae. It was described by Edward Meyrick in 1939. It is found on Fiji.

References

Moths described in 1939
Autosticha
Moths of Fiji